Elizabeth Anne Sanders (born 20 July 1931) is an English former cricketer who played primarily as a right-arm off break bowler. She appeared in 11 Test matches for England between 1954 and 1969. She played domestic cricket for Middlesex.

References

External links
 
 

1931 births
Living people
People from Chelsea, London
England women Test cricketers
Middlesex women cricketers